Marilyn Cooper (December 14, 1934 – April 22, 2009) was an American actress known primarily for her work on the Broadway stage.

Life and career
Born in New York City, Cooper made her Broadway debut in 1956 in the chorus of  Mr. Wonderful. Next she was in the chorus of a revival of Brigadoon.

In 1957, she played Rosalia, a Sharks girl who wants to go back to Puerto Rico ("Puerto Rico, you lovely island"), in the original Broadway production of West Side Story. In 1959, she went on to create the ensemble role of Agnes, the leader of the Hollywood Blondes, in the original Broadway production Gypsy. Before leaving the show, she briefly understudied the title role of Louise and played the part for one performance without having had an opportunity to rehearse Act 2. In 1962, she graduated to a leading role, playing the ingenue in I Can Get It for You Wholesale, opposite Elliott Gould and Sheree North (the show marked Barbra Streisand's Broadway debut at age 19).

Cooper enjoyed a long career in New York, appearing on Broadway in Hallelujah, Baby!; Golden Rainbow (understudying and going on for Eydie Gorme); Mame (succeeding Helen Gallagher as Agnes Gooch towards the end of the original Broadway run); Two by Two, starring Danny Kaye and Madeline Kahn; the 1971 revival of On the Town as Lucy Schmeeler, the blind date; and in Michael Bennett's Ballroom, starring Dorothy Loudon.

In 1981, Cooper created the supporting role of Jan Donovan, the wife of Tess Harding's ex-husband, Larry, in the Lauren Bacall vehicle Woman of the Year. Although she sang only one song, she effectively stole the show and won critical and popular acclaim, a Tony Award and a Drama Desk Award for performance by a featured actress in a musical. Cooper toured the United States with Bacall in the national tour of Woman of the Year that followed its successful Broadway run. She also reprised her role of Jan Donovan in the national touring production of Woman of the Year, starring Barbara Eden, from April 3, 1984, until September 16, 1984. In 1985, Cooper appeared in Neil Simon's female version of The Odd Couple. The following season she had a memorable vocal cameo as a radio actress in Simon's Broadway Bound.

Cooper can be heard on the original Broadway cast recordings of West Side Story, I Can Get It for You Wholesale, Two by Two, and
Woman of the Year. Additionally she appeared in
Fiorello!, One Touch of Venus, and Do Re Mi at New York City Center's "Encores!" series.

Cooper's television appearances include Alice, where she was reunited with Linda Lavin (singing "It's All in the Game"), Kate and Allie, Cheers (as Lilith Sternin's mother Betty), Law & Order, The Nanny and Caroline in the City. She also had a featured role with Tony Roberts and Kelly Bishop in the short-lived television series, The Thorns.

Death
Cooper died on April 22, 2009, at the Actors Fund Home in Englewood, New Jersey, following a long illness.

Broadway credits

 Mr. Wonderful (1956)
 Brigadoon (1957, revival)
 West Side Story (1957)
 Gypsy (1959)
 I Can Get It for You Wholesale (1961)
 West Side Story (1964 revival)
 Hallelujah, Baby! (1967)
 Golden Rainbow (1968)
 Mame (joined cast in December 1969)
 Two by Two (1970)
 On the Town (1971, revival)
 Working (1978)
 Ballroom (1978)
 Woman of the Year (musical) (1981)
 The Odd Couple (1985, revival, female version)
 Broadway Bound (1986)
 Cafe Crown (1989, revival)
 Grease (1994, revival)

References

External links

1934 births
2009 deaths
Actresses from New York City
American musical theatre actresses
American stage actresses
American television actresses
Drama Desk Award winners
Tony Award winners
20th-century American singers
20th-century American women singers
20th-century American actresses
21st-century American women